Dasybasis is a genus of horse flies in the family Tabanidae.

Species
Dasybasis acutipalpis (Macquart, 1838)
Dasybasis adornata (Kröber, 1934)
Dasybasis albohirta (Walker, 1836)
Dasybasis albohirtipes (Ferguson, 1921)
Dasybasis albosignata (Kröber, 1930)
Dasybasis alticola (Enderlein, 1925)
Dasybasis andicola (Philippi, 1862)
Dasybasis angusticallus (Ricardo, 1917)
Dasybasis anomala Mackerras & Rageau, 1958
Dasybasis antillanca González, 2014
Dasybasis antilope (Brèthes, 1910)
Dasybasis appendiculata Macquart, 1847
Dasybasis arauca Coscarón & Philip, 1967
Dasybasis argentina (Brèthes, 1910)
Dasybasis arica Coscarón & Philip, 1967
Dasybasis banksiensis (Ferguson & Hill, 1922)
Dasybasis barbata Coscarón & Philip, 1967
Dasybasis bejaranoi Coscarón & Philip, 1967
Dasybasis belenensis Coscarón & Philip, 1967
Dasybasis boliviame Coscarón & Philip, 1967
Dasybasis bonariensis (Macquart, 1838)
Dasybasis bratrankii (Nowicki, 1875)
Dasybasis brethesi Coscarón & Philip, 1967
Dasybasis bruchii (Brèthes, 1910)
Dasybasis bulbiscapens Coscarón & Philip, 1967
Dasybasis bulbula Coscarón & Philip, 1967
Dasybasis caesia (Walker, 1848)
Dasybasis calchaqui Coscarón & Philip, 1967
Dasybasis canipilis (Kröber, 1934)
Dasybasis caprii Coscarón & Philip, 1967
Dasybasis chazeaui Trojan, 1991
Dasybasis chilensis (Macquart, 1838)
Dasybasis chillan Coscarón, 1972
Dasybasis chubutensis Coscarón, 1962
Dasybasis circumdata (Walker, 1848)
Dasybasis cirra (Ricardo, 1917)
Dasybasis cirrus (Ricardo, 1917)
Dasybasis clavicallosa (Ricardo, 1917)
Dasybasis colla Coscarón, 1969
Dasybasis collagua González, 2014
Dasybasis columbiana (Enderlein, 1925)
Dasybasis constans (Walker, 1848)
Dasybasis coquimbo Coscarón, 1972
Dasybasis cretacea (Fedotova, 1991)
Dasybasis cumelafquen Coscarón, 1962
Dasybasis danielae Trojan, 1991
Dasybasis delpontei Coscarón & Philip, 1967
Dasybasis diaguita Coscarón & González, 1990
Dasybasis diemanensis (Ferguson, 1921)
Dasybasis difficilis (Kröber, 1931)
Dasybasis dixoni (Ferguson, 1921)
Dasybasis dubiosa (Ricardo, 1915)
Dasybasis edentula (Macquart, 1846)
Dasybasis eidsvoldensis (Taylor, 1919)
Dasybasis elquiensis González, 2000
Dasybasis erynnis (Brèthes, 1910)
Dasybasis evenhuisi Burger, 1995
Dasybasis excelsior Fairchild, 1956
Dasybasis exulans (Erichson, 1842)
Dasybasis fairchildi Coscarón & Philip, 1967
Dasybasis fornesi Coscarón, 1974
Dasybasis foroma Coscarón & Philip, 1967
Dasybasis frequens (Kröber, 1934)
Dasybasis froggatti (Ricardo, 1915)
Dasybasis fumifrons Coscarón & Philip, 1967
Dasybasis gemella (Walker, 1848)
Dasybasis geminata Coscarón & Philip, 1967
Dasybasis gentilis (Erichson, 1842)
Dasybasis germanica (Ricardo, 1915)
Dasybasis gracilipalpis Burger, 1995
Dasybasis gregaria (Erichson, 1842)
Dasybasis grenieri (Mackerras & Rageau, 1958)
Dasybasis griseoannulata (Taylor, 1917)
Dasybasis hebes (Walker, 1848)
Dasybasis hepperi Coscarón & Philip, 1967
Dasybasis hirsuta Coscarón & Philip, 1967
Dasybasis hobartiensis (White, 1915)
Dasybasis imperfecta (Walker, 1848)
Dasybasis inata Coscarón & Philip, 1967
Dasybasis indefinita (Taylor, 1918)
Dasybasis innotata (Ferguson & Henry, 1920)
Dasybasis kewensis (Ferguson & Henry, 1920)
Dasybasis kroeberi Coscarón & Philip, 1967
Dasybasis kuniae (Mackerras & Rageau, 1958)
Dasybasis limbativena (Kröber, 1931)
Dasybasis loewi (Enderlein, 1925)
Dasybasis lydiae Trojan, 1991
Dasybasis macrophthalma (Schiner, 1868)
Dasybasis maletecta (Bigot, 1892)
Dasybasis mellicallosa Mackerras & Rageau, 1958
Dasybasis mendozana (Enderlein, 1925)
Dasybasis microdonta (Mackerras, 1947)
Dasybasis microdonta (Macquart, 1847)
Dasybasis milsoni (Ricardo, 1917)
Dasybasis milsoni (Taylor, 1917)
Dasybasis minor (Macquart, 1850)
Dasybasis missionum (Macquart, 1838)
Dasybasis montium (Surcouf, 1919)
Dasybasis moretonensis (Ferguson & Hill, 1922)
Dasybasis nemopunctata (Ricardo, 1914)
Dasybasis nemotuberculata (Ricardo, 1914)
Dasybasis neobasalis (Taylor, 1918)
Dasybasis neocirrus (Ricardo, 1917)
Dasybasis neogermanica (Ricardo, 1915)
Dasybasis neogrisescens (Kröber, 1934)
Dasybasis neolatifrons (Ferguson & Hill, 1922)
Dasybasis neopalpalis (Ferguson & Hill, 1920)
Dasybasis nigra (Enderlein, 1925)
Dasybasis nigrifemur (Kröber, 1934)
Dasybasis nigrifrons (Philippi, 1863)
Dasybasis nigripes (Kröber, 1931)
Dasybasis ochreoflava (Ferguson & Henry, 1920)
Dasybasis oculata (Ricardo, 1915)
Dasybasis opaca (Brèthes, 1910)
Dasybasis opla (Walker, 1850)
Dasybasis ornatissima (Brèthes, 1910)
Dasybasis padix (Taylor, 1917)
Dasybasis pallipes (Kröber, 1931)
Dasybasis parva (Taylor, 1913)
Dasybasis penai Coscarón & Philip, 1967
Dasybasis perdignata (Kröber, 1934)
Dasybasis pereirai Coscarón & Philip, 1967
Dasybasis ponandouensis Burger, 1995
Dasybasis postica (Wiedemann, 1828)
Dasybasis postponens (Walker, 1848)
Dasybasis pseudocallosa (Ferguson & Hill, 1922)
Dasybasis punensis (Hine, 1920)
Dasybasis rageaui Mackerras, 1962
Dasybasis rainbowi (Taylor, 1918)
Dasybasis regisgeorgii (Macquart, 1838)
Dasybasis rieki Ferguson & Yeates, 2015
Dasybasis rubicallosa (Ricardo, 1914)
Dasybasis rufifrons (Macquart, 1855)
Dasybasis sarpa (Walker, 1850)
Dasybasis schineri (Kröber, 1931)
Dasybasis schnusei (Kröber, 1931)
Dasybasis senilis (Philippi, 1865)
Dasybasis setipalpis Burger, 1995
Dasybasis shannoni (Kröber, 1930)
Dasybasis spadix (Taylor, 1917)
Dasybasis spatiosa (Ricardo, 1915)
Dasybasis standfasti Mackerras, 1964
Dasybasis subtrita Coscarón & Philip, 1967
Dasybasis tasmaniensis (White, 1915)
Dasybasis testaceomaculata (Macquart, 1838)
Dasybasis thereviformis Mackerras, 1957
Dasybasis tillierorum Trojan, 1991
Dasybasis transversa (Walker, 1854)
Dasybasis trigonophora (Macquart, 1838)
Dasybasis trilinealis (Ferguson & Henry, 1920)
Dasybasis tritus (Walker, 1836)
Dasybasis truncata (Walker, 1850)
Dasybasis tryphera (Taylor, 1917)
Dasybasis vasta Coscarón & Philip, 1967
Dasybasis vespiformis (Ferguson & Henry, 1920)
Dasybasis vetusta (Walker, 1848)
Dasybasis viridis (Hudson, 1892)

References

Tabanidae
Diptera of South America
Diptera of Australasia
Taxa named by Pierre-Justin-Marie Macquart
Brachycera genera